Suphan Buri is a town (thesaban mueang) in central Thailand. It covers tambon Tha Philiang and parts of tambons Rua Yai and Tha Rahat, all within the Mueang Suphan Buri District. As of 2006 it had a population of 26,656. The town is 101 km north-northwest of Bangkok.

Geography
The surrounding area is low-lying and flat, with rice farms covering much of the land.

Climate
Suphan Buri has a tropical wet and dry climate (Köppen climate classification Aw). Winters are quite dry and very warm. The monsoon season runs from May through October, with heavy rain and somewhat cooler temperatures during the day, although nights remain warm.

History

19th-century Siamese historian and statesman Damrong Rajanubhab speculated that the city was founded under the name Suvarnapurī around 1350, around the time when nearby U Thong was plagued by an epidemic. U Thong was the capital of the Kingdom of Suphannaphum, one of the mueang of the Dvaravati period, in which Ramathibodi I had reigned before founding Ayutthaya, the capital of the homonymous kingdom in the same period. U Thong's ancient name was Suphannaphum or Suvarnabhumi (literally: the origin or birthplace of gold), which was probably abandoned when the water shortage epidemic raged and Suvarnapurī was founded along the Tha Chin River. Ramathibodi appointed his brother-in-law Khunluang Pha Ngua as governor of Suvarnapurī, who gave the city its present name Suphanburi and who would become king of Ayutthaya in 1370 with the name Borommarachathirat I.

Later, Suphanburi remained a frontier town between Siam and the kingdoms that alternated in modern day Burma. Several battles were fought in its surroundings between the Siamese and Burmese armies until the first half of the 19th century. The most important was the one that took place on January 18, 1593 in Nong Sarai, a few kilometers northwest of the city. The battle was in progress, when the Siamese king Naresuan challenged the heir to the throne of the Toungoo dynasty to a duel on the back of elephants to decide the fate of the clash. Within minutes Naresuan killed his rival, the Burmese troops withdrew and Ayutthaya thus gained independence after 29 years of vassalage at Pegu's court. The provincial coat of arms still remembers this duel.

The municipality took on its present form during the reign of Mongkut (1851-1868), when the central nucleus was unified with the neighboring settlements. Suphanburi underwent major changes in the years between the 20th and 21st centuries at the behest of Banharn Silpa-Archa, a wealthy entrepreneur native of the city who was prime minister of Thailand between 1995 and 1996. Banharn was accused of spending the 90% of the national budget for the Suphanburi Province. Among the various infrastructures he had built, many of which took the name Baharn-Jaemsai (Jaemsai is the name of his wife), there are seven schools, a 123-meter high tower in the city center, another tower where a clock and a series of pedestrian bridges that cross wide, almost deserted streets.

Culture
Suphan Buri is the place where Luk thung Superstar Pumpuang Duangjan was buried and is sometimes called the Thai Nashville, as it is an important center of the music industry.

Transportation

Suphan Buri is at the end of a  branch line of the State Railway of Thailand's southern line. The branch meets the main line at Nong Pla Duk Junction near Ban Pong.

Route 340 passes through Suphan Buri, leading north to Chai Nat and south to Bang Bua Phong. Route 321 leads west and then south to Nakhon Pathom. Route 329 leads east to Bang Pahan. Route 3195 leads northeast to Ang Thong.

Gallery

References

External links

Populated places in Suphan Buri province
Cities and towns in Thailand